Air Chief Marshal Abu Esrar, BBP, NDC, ACSC was the 14th Chief of the Air Staff of the Bangladesh Air Force. He took over as the chief on 12 June 2015 from Air Marshal Enamul Bari. He is the first four-star air officer (Air Chief Marshal) of Bangladesh. He was promoted to ACM on 16 January 2016.

Birth
Esrar was born in 1961 in Gazipur to Abu Ayub and Akhtarunnesa.

Air Force career
Esrar joined the Bangladesh Air Force on 19 September 1978. He was commissioned in the GD(P) branch on 1 February 1981. He has worked in most of the squadrons of BAF. He has flown PT-6, AA-SA, Fugi-200, MiG-29. He has also worked as instructor of new pilots.

He has worked as Defense Attache in Moscow, Russia. Before assume the post of air chief he served as Assistant Chief of Air Staff (Operations and Training).

Abu Esrar has undergone many courses in Bangladesh and abroad. He has completed 'Flying  Instructors Course' in the United Kingdom  and  'Flying Supervisors Course' in Australia. He has undergone training of A5IIIA and MiG-29 in China and Russia respectively.

Esrar was awarded the prestigious BBP medal (Biman Bahini Padak, Air Force Medal in English) in 2013. He is a graduate of Air Command and Staff College (ACSC) located at Maxwell Air Force Base in Montgomery, Alabama and also is an alumnus of 'National Defence College' (NDC) - Dhaka, Bangladesh.

References

Bangladesh Air Force air marshals
1961 births
Living people
Chiefs of Air Staff (Bangladesh)